François Aimé Louis Dumoulin (10 August 1753 in Vevey – 16 February 1834 in Vevey) was a Swiss painter and engraver.

Biography 
Although he received some education in technical drawing, Dumoulin was initially intended for a commercial career. In 1772, he sailed to England and to America the next year. Arriving in Grenada, he made business while drawing plans and views for the governor.

From 1776 to 1782, Dumoulin was a witness to the American War of Independence, drawing several naval battles between the French Navy and the British Royal Navy.

Returned to Vevey in 1783, he turned his sketches of the battles into oil paintings and watercolours, earning his life diving drawing lessons.

Between 1795 and 1797, Dumoulin was in Paris, where he took lessons in anatomy, copied ancient paintings in the Louvre, attended the Academy and the School of naval constructions. Two of his paintings of naval battles were exposed at the 1796 Salon.

Back to Vevey in 1797, he opened a class in technical drawing.

In 1810, Dumoulin published a collection of 150 engravings themed on the journey of Robinson Crusoe, which is considered to be a precursor to modern comics.

Sources and references

Bibliography 
 Carl Brun, Schweizerisches Künstler-Lexikon, Frauenfeld, 1905–1917, p. 397.
 Paul Morand, Monsieur Dumoulin à l’Isle de la Grenade, Paudex, 1976 [biographie fictive et littéraire avec des reproductions en couleur des œuvres du Musée historique de Vevey].
 Françoise Bonnet Borel, «Dumoulin, peintre veveysan», dans Vibiscum, 2, 1991, p. 59-97.
 Annie Renonciat, « Le Robinson de Dumoulin : un roman en 150 estampes (ca 1810) », dans 9e Art, Les Cahiers du musée de la bande dessinée, Angoulême, n° 8, janvier 2003, p. 10-19.
 Thierry Smolderen, « Ceci n’est pas une bulle ! - Structures énonciatives du phylactère », 2006

Notes and references

External links
 
 

18th-century Swiss painters
18th-century Swiss male artists
Swiss male painters
19th-century Swiss painters
1834 deaths
1753 births
19th-century Swiss male artists